The Prayag–Bareilly Express is an Express train belonging to Northern Railway zone that runs between  (in Allahabad) and  in India. It is currently being operated with 14307/14308 train numbers on a daily basis.

Service

The 14307/Prayag–Bareilly Express has an average speed of 36 km/hr and covers 461 km in 12h 40m. The 14308/Bareilly–Prayag Express has an average speed of 38 km/hr and covers 461 km in 12h 15m.

Route and halts 

The important halts of the train are:

Coach composition

The train has standard ICF rakes with max speed of 110 kmph. The train consists of 16 coaches:

 8 General Unreserved
 2 Seating cum Luggage Rake

Traction

Both trains are hauled by a Lucknow Loco Shed-based WDM-3A diesel locomotive from Allahabad to Bareilly and vice versa.

Rake sharing

The train shares its rake with 54375/54376 Prayag–Jaunpur Passenger.

See also 

 Prayag Junction railway station
 Bareilly Junction railway station
 Prayag–Jaunpur Passenger

Notes

References

External links 

 14307/Prayag - Bareilly Express
 14308/Bareilly - Prayag Express

Trains from Allahabad
Trains from Bareilly
Express trains in India